John G. Stower (1791 Madison, Madison County, New York – December 20, 1850 in Chittenango, Madison Co., NY) was an American lawyer and politician from New York and Florida. From 1827 to 1829, he served one term in the  U.S. House of Representatives.

Life
He married Harriet (1795–1823), and they had several children. In 1817, he began publishing the Hamilton Recorder with P. B. Havens. He was Surrogate of Madison County from 1821 to 1827. On September 2, 1824, he married Amelia Kellogg (1804–1882), and their only child died in infancy.

Congress 
Stower was elected as a Jacksonian to the 20th United States Congress, holding office from March 4, 1827, to March 3, 1829.

On April 20, 1829, Stower received a recess appointment from President Andrew Jackson as United States Attorney for the Southern District of Florida, and took up his duties at Key West, Florida. He resigned in March 1830, before the U.S. Senate took a vote on the nomination.

Later career and death 
He was a member of the New York State Senate (5th D.) from 1833 to 1835, sitting in the 56th, 57th and 58th New York State Legislatures. He resigned his seat on September 29, 1835.

He was President of the Village of Chittenango, New York from 1847 to 1848.

He died of "consumption and pulmonary attack", and was buried at the Madison Street Cemetery in Hamilton.

Sources

The New York Civil List compiled by Franklin Benjamin Hough (pages 129f, 146 and 414; Weed, Parsons and Co., 1858)
Journal of the U.S. Senate (1830; pg. 442)
A Register of Officers and Agents...In the Service of the United States (September 1829; pg. 223)
Gazetteer of the State of New York by J. H. French (1860; pg. 389)
Stowers Families of America (pg. 100f) [gives name erroneously as "Stowers"]

External links

1791 births
1850 deaths
New York (state) state senators
United States Attorneys for the Southern District of Florida
People from Madison, New York
New York (state) state court judges
19th-century American newspaper editors
Jacksonian members of the United States House of Representatives from New York (state)
19th-century American politicians
People from Chittenango, New York
Members of the United States House of Representatives from New York (state)